Tears of Themis is a free-to-play adventure game developed and published by Hoyoverse. The game was first released in Mainland China with Simplified Chinese language in July 2020 for Android and iOS. The worldwide version, which includes Simplified and Traditional Chinese, Japanese, Korean, and English language was released a year later.

Gameplay
Tears of Themis has a number of different mechanics. The main story is delivered in a visual novel format. Cases are analyzed through searching the crime scene for evidence, and interrogating NPCs who are involved. Each chapter ends with a trial in court, in which the player must present evidence which proves their defendant innocent.

During each chapter, debates play out in a card battle format using cards collected from the gacha system. Each card has an attribute which changes what cards it is effective against. The three attributes are Intuition, Logic, and Empathy. Cards can be leveled up to increase attribute stats, or have their skill proficiency increased. The cards also gain experience through being used in debates.

The romance side of the gameplay is involved through side stories which explore the characterization of the four male leads. Similar to Mystic Messenger, the player also receives voice and text messages from them (framed as if they were sent to the player character in-universe).

Voice acting for the entire game is available in Chinese, Japanese, and Korean.

Story
The story of Tears of Themis takes place in the year 2030, in a science fiction setting of the fictional city of Stellis. The player takes the role of an unnamed 24 year-old female defense lawyer at Themis Legal Office (nicknamed "Rosa"), as she defends her clients in a criminal case. An overarching mystery plays out over the course of every main story chapter. Four different bachelors assist her with the cases, which is where the romantic elements of the story are introduced.

The four male characters are Xiayan (Chinese: 夏彦; Japanese: 水無瀬夏彦; English: Luke Pearce; Korean: 강혁; Nickname: Raven), Zuoran (Chinese:左然; Japanese: 左京静真; English: Artem Wing; Korean: 백은후; Nickname: Libra), Lu Jinghe (Chinese: 陆景和; Japanese: 和泉景; English: Marius Von Hagen; Korean: 유신우; Nickname: Kings), Moyi (Chinese: 莫弈; Japanese: 森月黎; English: Vyn Richter; Korean: 윤노아; Nickname: Adjudicator).

Development
The worldwide version of the game was in a closed beta period from April to May 2021. A pre-registration period began in June 2021, which gave those who registered early free rewards in game. Over 650,000 players pre-registered. There was a second pre-release campaign counting the number of Twitter followers on the official account, which also gave in-game rewards. It has won the 2022 Pocket Gamer People’s Choice Award.

Notes

References

External links
 
 Official Chinese website

2020 video games
Criminal law video games
Free-to-play video games
Gacha games
Android (operating system) games
IOS games
Otome games
MiHoYo games
Video games developed in China